In physics the Stoney units form a system of units named after the Irish physicist George Johnstone Stoney, who first proposed them in 1881. They are the earliest example of natural units, i.e., a coherent set of units of measurement designed so that chosen physical constants fully define and are included in the set.

Units 

The constants that Stoney used to define his set of units is the following:<ref>[https://books.google.com/books?id=sGk05bF9KJEC&pg=PA79 Astrophysics, clocks and fundamental constants, by Karshenboim and Peik, p. 79]</ref>
 , the speed of light in vacuum,
 , the gravitational constant,
 , the vacuum permittivity,
 , the elementary charge.

This means that the numerical values of all these constants, when expressed in coherent Stoney units, is equal one:

In Stoney units, the numerical value of the reduced Planck constant is

where  is the fine-structure constant.

 History 

George Stoney was one of the first scientists to understand that electric charge was quantized; from this quantization and three other constants that he perceived as being universal (a speed from electromagnetism, and the coefficients in the electrostatic and gravitational force equations) he derived the units that are now named after him.G. Johnstone Stoney, On The Physical Units of Nature, The Scientific Proceedings of the Royal Dublin Society, 3, 51–60, 1883. Retrieved 2010-11-28.

 Stoney units and Planck units 

Stoney's set of base units is similar to the one used in Planck units, proposed independently by Planck thirty years later, in which Planck normalized the Planck constant in place of the elementary charge.

Planck units are more commonly used than Stoney units in modern physics, especially for quantum gravity (including string theory). Rarely, Planck units are referred to as Planck–Stoney units.

The Stoney length and the Stoney energy, collectively called the Stoney scale, are not far from the Planck length and the Planck energy, the Planck scale''. The Stoney scale and the Planck scale are the length and energy scales at which quantum processes and gravity occur together. At these scales, a unified theory of physics is thus required. The only notable attempt to construct such a theory from the Stoney scale was that of H. Weyl, who associated a gravitational unit of charge with the Stoney length
and who appears to have inspired Dirac's fascination with the large numbers hypothesis.
Since then, the Stoney scale has been largely neglected in the development of modern physics, although it is still occasionally discussed.

See also 

 Dimensional analysis
 Natural units
 Physical constants
 Planck scale

Notes

References

External links